Renny Lister (born 24 May 1934) is a British retired film and television actress.

Personal life
Lister was born on 24 May 1934 in Manchester. She married Eric Lister in 1953, the marriage later ended in divorce although she retained her first husband's name as her stage name. Lister married film and television actor Kenneth Cope in 1961. They had two sons and one daughter together. Their sons Nick and Mark Cope went on to form a rock band, The Candyskins. Their daughter, Martha Cope, is an actress. In 1997, Lister announced her retirement.

Selected filmography

Film
The Curse of the Werewolf (1961)
A Touch of the Other (1970)
Personal Services (1987)

Television
Coronation Street (1961)
 The Massingham Affair (1964)
 Dr. Finlay's Casebook (Episode: The Spinster, 1965)
 Edgar Wallace Mysteries (Episode: Dead Man's Chest , Flora, 1965)
Sergeant Cork
Bowler
Holding On
Don't Forget to Write!
Callan

References

External links

1934 births
Living people
British film actresses
British television actresses